Attorney General Skinner may refer to:

Cortlandt Skinner (1727–1799), Royal Attorney General of New Jersey
James John Skinner (1923–2008), Attorney General of Zambia

See also
General Skinner (disambiguation)